Fewer versus less is the debate revolving around grammatically using the words fewer and less correctly. The common perspective of today is that fewer should be used (instead of less) with nouns for countable objects and concepts (discretely quantifiable nouns, or count nouns). On the other hand less should be used only with a grammatically singular noun (including mass nouns). This distinction was first expressed by grammarian Robert Baker in 1770, and has been supported as a general rule since then by other notable grammarians. However, a more recent perspective based on current usage notes that, while the rule for fewer stands, the word less is used more fluidly.

Controversy

This rule can be seen in the examples "there is less flour in this canister" and "there are fewer cups (grains, pounds, bags, etc.) of flour in this canister", which are based on the reasoning that flour is uncountable whereas the unit used to measure the flour (cup, etc.) is countable. However, some prescriptivists prescribe the rule addition that less should be used with units of measurement (e.g. "less than 10 pounds/dollars"). Prescriptivists might, however, consider "fewer cups of coffee" to be correct in a sentence such as "there are fewer cups of coffee on the table now", where the cups are countable separate objects. In addition, "less" is sometimes recommended in front of counting nouns that denote distance, amount, or time. For example, "we go on holiday in fewer than four weeks" and "he can run the 100 m in fewer than ten seconds" are not advised by some people.

Some prescriptivists argue that the rare and unidiomatic one fewer should be used instead of one less (both when used alone or together with a singular, discretely quantifiable noun as in "there is one fewer cup on this table"), but Merriam–Webster's Dictionary of English Usage says that "of course [less] follows one.

Current usage
The comparative less is used with both countable and uncountable nouns in some informal discourse environments and in most dialects of English. In other informal discourse however, the use of fewer could be considered natural. Many supermarket checkout line signs, for instance, will read "10 items or less"; others, however, will use fewer in an attempt to conform to prescriptive grammar. Descriptive grammarians consider this to be a case of hypercorrection as explained in Pocket Fowler's Modern English Usage. A British supermarket chain replaced its "10 items or less" notices at checkouts with "up to 10 items" to avoid the issue. It has also been noted that it is less common to favour "At fewest ten items" over "At least ten items" – a potential inconsistency in the "rule", and a study of online usage seems to suggest that the distinction may, in fact, be semantic rather than grammatical. Likewise, it would be very unusual to hear the unidiomatic "I have seen that film at fewest ten times."

The Cambridge Guide to English Usage notes that the "pressure to substitute fewer for less seems to have developed out of all proportion to the ambiguity it may provide in noun phrases like less promising results". It describes conformance with this pressure as a shibboleth and the choice "between the more formal fewer and the more spontaneous less" as a stylistic choice.

Historical usage
Less has historically been used in English with countable nouns, but a distinction between the use of fewer and less is first recorded in the 18th century. On this, Merriam–Webster's Dictionary of English Usage notes:

As far as we have been able to discover, the received rule originated in 1770 as a comment on less: "This Word is most commonly used in speaking of a Number; where I should think Fewer would do better. 'No Fewer than a Hundred' appears to me, not only more elegant than 'No less than a Hundred', but more strictly proper." (Robert Baker 1770). Baker's remarks about 'fewer' express clearly and modestly – 'I should think,' 'appears to me' – his own taste and preference....Notice how Baker's preference has been generalized and elevated to an absolute status and his notice of contrary usage has been omitted."

The oldest use that the Oxford English Dictionary gives for less with a countable noun is a quotation from 888 by Alfred the Great:

("With  or with more, whether we may prove it.")

This is in fact an Old English partitive construction using the "quasi-substantive" adverb  and the genitive  ("less of words") (cf. plenty of words and *plenty words). When the genitive plural ceased to exist, less of words became less words, and this construction has been used since then until the present.

See also
 Grammatical number
 
 Count noun
 Quantization (linguistics)

Footnotes

References

External links
 Less/Fewer on BBC World Service
 Less/Fewer on Oxford Dictionaries
 History, and exceptions to the rule
 Discrete vs. continuous numbering (the Chicago Manual of Style)
 Translation Directory on if the rule is still relevant and where it can be confusing

English grammar
English usage controversies